Roisia's Cross is a cross in Royston, Hertfordshire, at the crossroads of Ermine Street and the Icknield Way (cum Ashwell Street).

Most likely it was in the southeast angle of the crossroads in the parish of Barkway. This was in the fee of the Lordship of Newsells. The first recorded owner was Eudo Dapifer, steward to William the Conqueror. Whether there was some monument predating this remains a matter for speculation. However, the footstone still exists.
The 18th century antiquarian Reverend William Stukeley described it as:

References

Buildings and structures in Hertfordshire
Cross symbols
Monuments and memorials in Hertfordshire
Royston, Hertfordshire